Pava or PAVA may refer to:

 Pāvā (now Padrauna), a city in ancient India, which Buddha visited during his last journey
 Pava (Puerto Rico), a hat related to the Jibaro of Puerto Rico
 Pava, Iran, a village in Razavi Khorasan Province, Iran
 Pacific American Volunteer Association
 Pawapuri (or Pava), a holy site for Jains in Bihar, India, where Mahavira attained Nirvana 
 Pelargonic acid vanillylamide or Nonivamide
 PAVA spray
 Chevak Airport (ICAO location indicator: PAVA), in Chevak, Alaska, United States
 Iranian Security Police (PAVA), of Iran
 Pool adjacent violators algorithm, an algorithm for one-dimensional isotonic regression

See also
 
 La Pava, Olá District, Coclé Province, Panama
 Las Pavas, a Colombian emerald mining area